Thomas O'Connell (20 October 1939 – 16 May 2019) is an Irish retired hurler who played as a left corner-forward for the Kilkenny senior team.

O'Connell made his first appearance for the team during the 1959 championship and was a semi-regular member of the starting fifteen for the following seven seasons. During that time he won one Leinster winners' medal. He ended up as an All-Ireland runner-up on one occasion, after scoring a hat-trick of goals in the final. 

At club level O'Connell was a two-time county club championship medalist with Fenians.

References

1939 births
2019 deaths
Éire Óg (Kilkenny) hurlers
Fenians hurlers
Kilkenny inter-county hurlers
English emigrants to Ireland
English people of Irish descent
People from Romford